Gamvik Airport is a disused general aviation airport located at Slettnes outside the village of Gamvik in Gamvik, Norway.

History
A Finnmark County Municipality-appointed committee which in published a report in 1966 recommending Mehamn as one of six regional airports in Troms og Finnmark. As Finnmark had lowest priority on the state-financed construction of regional airports, Norving took initiative to start construction of smaller and simpler airfields in select communities, including Gamvik. The airline also looked into two other locations on Nordkinnhalvøya, Mehamn and Kjøllefjord. The main motivation for an airport was the difficulties of transporting patients to the hospital. Until a quay was built in 1971, the Hurtigruten ships anchored up and patients had to be freight to the ship by boat before venturing on the voyage to the hospital.

The airline therefore contacted the municipality in December 1969 and proposed that an airfield be built within a year, which it could operate with its Britten-Norman Islander aircraft. When the Civil Aviation Administration (CAA) started planning an airport for the area, it considered both Kjøllefjord, Mehamn and Gamvik as locations for the regional airport. In early 1971 mean time Norving and local interest started looking for a suitable site in Gamvik. A committee was created for the task, which initiated a cooperation with the municipality. It was possible to take advantage of the weather station and radio navigation equipment at Slettnes Lighthouse. A gravel runway was estimated to cost 76,000 Norwegian krone, in addition to simple runway lights.

Initially the CAA supported Gamvik as a location for a regional airport, in part because of the lower investment costs. The municipal council in Gamvik instead chose the municipal center of Mehamn,  from Gamvik. The Gamvik chapter of the Norwegian Red Cross Search and Rescue Corps started fund-raising for Gamvik to build its own airport. It applied to the municipality, but no public funds were granted. Norving was the main contributor, funding NOK 53,000. The population of Gamvik of between 400 and 500 people donated NOK 60,000. A new committee was established and they started construction after the spring thaw started in June 1971. Within five weeks  of runway had been built. The airport opened on 29 August.

The airfield was used for Norving's air ambulance and air taxi service which was flown using the Britten-Norman Islander. The operation of the airport was carried out as a cooperation between Gamvik Search and Rescue Corps and Norving. Yngvar Svendsen, the airline's contact person in Gamvik, was responsible for operations and manned the radio. For the first ten months he worked free of charge. Norving applied in 1972 to establish a scheduled taxi route from Gamvik. Mehamn Airport opened in 1974 along with an all-year road between Gamvik and Mehamn, which resulted in Gamvik Airport being reduced to an emergency airport.

Facilities
The airport was located at Slettnes outside Gamvik. The airport had an  gravel runway. Travel distance to Mehamn was 20 minutes and to Kjøllefjord one hour.

References

Bibliography
 
 

Airports in Troms og Finnmark
Airports established in 1971
1971 establishments in Norway
Gamvik
Defunct airports in Norway